The Battle of Khasdour took place in the Eleşkirt Valley on 12 May 1898 where the Armenian fedayi fighters led by Aghbiur Serob from Transcaucasia engaged with the Ottoman army units. Armenians defended themselves well, eventually making a path between the Ottoman forces to escape. Although the Turks had won the battle, the Armenians managed to survive and escape into the mountains along with their leader Aghbiur Serob.

In the Ahlat region, for several years, the mountains were controlled by Serob Pasha until November 1899 when together with 12 of his men, he died in a gunfight with 1,500 Kurdish tribal soldiers.

Battles involving Armenia
Battles involving Turkey